is a Tokyo-based publishing company. Getsuyosha was started on 7 December 2000, and mainly publishes books on philosophy, cultural studies, and fine arts.

External links
 Getsuyosha Limited
 有限会社月曜社

Book publishing companies in Tokyo